The discography of American rock band Falling in Reverse consists of four studio albums, one demo album, thirty-one singles, twenty-one music videos and two other appearances.

The group released its debut album, The Drug in Me Is You, on July 26, 2011, which peaked at No. 19 on the Billboard 200, selling 18,000 copies in its first week. On December 17, 2019 the album was certified gold by RIAA equivalent to 500,000 copies sold. The band's second studio album, Fashionably Late, was released on June 18, 2013, which peaked at No. 17 on the Billboard 200, selling 20,000 copies in its first week. The band released their third album Just Like You on February 24, 2015, which peaked at No. 21 on the Billboard 200. Coming Home, their latest album, was released on April 7, 2017. which peaked at No. 34 on the Billboard 200.

The band's first single to debut on the music charts was "Alone" which was released on May 7, 2013. The song peaked at #27 on Billboard'''s Hot Rock & Alternative Songs chart. It also debuted at #14 on the UK Rock & Metal Singles Chart. "Fashionably Late" was their second single from the band to chart on the Hot Rock & Alternative Songs chart peaking at #46, the song was released on May 20, 2013. On December 15, 2014 the band released the single "God, If You Are Above...", The song reached #45 on the Hot Rock & Alternative Songs chart and also the song debuted on Billboard's Mainstream Rock chart, being the first time that the band is positioned on this list, it reached #28. On January 17, 2017 the band released the single "Loser", the song reached #35 on the Hot Rock & Alternative Songs chart. On July 10, 2017 the band released the single "Superhero",  the song reached #22 on the Mainstream Rock chart. On February 22, 2018 the band released the single "Losing My Mind", the song reached #50 on the Hot Rock & Alternative Songs chart. On November 20, 2019 the band released the single "Popular Monster", the song reached the top of the Billboard rock charts. The song reached #4 on the Hot Rock & Alternative Songs chart and reached #1 on the Mainstream Rock chart being their first song to reach the top spot on the chart. In addition, the song reached #15 on the Rock Airplay chart and #38 on the Canada Rock chart, being the first time that the band was positioned on these charts. Additionally, the song debuted at # 1 on Billboard's'' new Hot Hard Rock Songs chart. The song also debuted at #17 on the UK Rock & Metal Singles Chart and also at #33 on the main Hungarian charts. On February 13, 2020 the band released the reimagined version of "The Drug in Me Is You" called "The Drug in Me Is Reimagined", the song reached # 29 on the Hot Rock & Alternative Songs chart and also # 32 of Hungary's top charts.

Albums

Studio albums

Demo albums

Extended plays

Singles

Other appearances

Music videos

Footnotes

References

External links
 
Falling in Reverse at AllMusic

Discography
Discographies of American artists
Punk rock discographies